"Super High" is the first single from rapper Rick Ross from his fourth studio album Teflon Don. The song features Ne-Yo.

The song samples "Silly Love Song" by Enchantment.

Music video
The music video premiered on May 24, 2010 on MTV Jams. The F. Gary Gray-directed video stars actress Stacey Dash.
The song contains samples of "Gangsta Gangsta" by N.W.A and the drum break of Barry White's "I'm Gonna Love You Just A Little Bit More Babe".

Remixes
The official remix is called the "Sativa Remix" and features Ne-Yo, Curren$y & Wiz Khalifa. A viral music video was also released. Another remix was released featuring Ace Hood and Wiz Khalifa instead of Curren$y.

Charts

References

2010 singles
2010 songs
Rick Ross songs
Ne-Yo songs
Maybach Music Group singles
Songs written by Ne-Yo
Songs written by Rick Ross
Music videos directed by F. Gary Gray